Arno Doerksen (born January 25, 1958) is a Canadian politician.

Early life

Doerksen was born in the Town of Bassano, Alberta, Canada and raised in Gem. He spent more than 25 years in farming and ranching before entering politics. He is a purebred and commercial cattle producer and feedlot operator in partnership with his family. They grow alfalfa, grain and oilseed crops on irrigated land in the Eastern Irrigation District.

Political career

Doerksen won the 2008 provincial election with 75 per cent of the vote in the constituency of Strathmore-Brooks. He was a member of the Private Bills Committee, the Privileges and Elections, Standing Orders and Printing Committee, and the Standing Committee on Community Services. Doerksen chairs the Endangered Species Conservation Committee. More information about Arno Doerksen is available from his website at ArnoDoerksen.ca.

Personal life

Doerksen lives with his wife Wanda in Gem, Alberta. They have three sons: Barry, Daniel and Lorin. His community involvement includes the Gem Curling Club, Gem Grazing Association, Gem Home and School Association, his local church board and Camp Evergreen.

Doerksen was chair of the Alberta Beef Producers during the BSE (mad cow disease) crisis in 2003 and 2004. He has travelled internationally as a representative of Alberta and Canada's livestock industry. Doerksen chaired the Canada Beef Export Federation from 2006 to 2008.

In 2004, Doerksen was named one of the 50 most influential Albertans in Alberta Venture. He has received a 10-year leadership award from the Canadian 4-H Council.

Election results

References

Progressive Conservative Association of Alberta MLAs
Living people
1958 births
People from the County of Newell
21st-century Canadian politicians